Dejan Stojković (born 11 July 1977) is a former Serbian footballer.

References

1977 births
Footballers from Belgrade
Living people
Serbian footballers
FK Rad players
FK Milicionar players
FC Elista players
Serbian expatriate footballers
Expatriate footballers in Russia
Russian Premier League players
FK Železnik players
ŁKS Łódź players
Expatriate footballers in Poland
FK Sloga Kraljevo players
NSÍ Runavík players
Expatriate footballers in the Faroe Islands
FK Radnički 1923 players
Association football forwards